Cullompton Rangers LFC were an English women's football club. Formerly known as Exeter City L.F.C. the club amalgamated with Cullompton Rangers AFC and were formally granted a name change by Devon FA in 2006. 
They played their home matches at Speeds Meadow, Cullompton, Devon. In 2011 the club folded when the manager was forced to leave and a replacement could not be found.

Honours
As Cullompton Rangers L.F.C.:
South West Women's Football League – Premier Division Champions: 1
2008–09
Devon County Cup Winners: 1
2007
As Exeter City L.F.C.:
Pat Sowden Cup Winners: 1
2002
South West Women's Football League – Premier Division Champions: 1
2001–02

As Elmore Eagles L.F.C.:
South West Women's Football League – Premier Division Runners Up: 1
1999–00
Devon Cup Winners: 2
1998, 1999
Pat Sowden Cup Winners: 1
1998
South West Women's Football League – Third Division Champions: 1
1997–98

Seasons Records

Squad

Staff
Manager: Phill Tuckett
Coach: Maxine Coupe
Chairman: Bill Newcombe 
Secretary c/o: Emma Redwood

See also
Cullompton Rangers A.F.C.

References  

Exeter City F.C.
Defunct women's football clubs in England
Defunct football clubs in Devon
Association football clubs established in 1997
1997 establishments in England
Cullompton Rangers F.C.
Cullompton
Association football clubs disestablished in 2011